The Fifth Court of Appeals of Texas is one of the 14 Texas Courts of Appeals.  It currently sits in Dallas, Texas.  It has simultaneously both the smallest Court of Appeals' jurisdictional geographic size (only six counties, one of which is shared with another Court), and the largest composition (13 Justices).

Jurisdiction
The Fifth Court presides over appeals from the following counties:

 Collin
 Dallas
 Grayson
 Hunt (*)
 Kaufman
 Rockwall

(*) This county shares jurisdiction with the Sixth Court of Appeals of Texas.

Current justices
As authorized under Chapter 22 of the Texas Government Code, the Fifth Court consists of a Chief Justice and 12 associate justices.

 Robert D. Burns, III (Chief Justice)
 Lana Myers
 David Schenck
 Ken Molberg
 Leslie Lester Osborne
 Robbie Partida-Kipness
 Bill Pedersen, III
 Amanda L. Reichek
 Erin A. Nowell
 Cory L. Carlyle
 Bonnie Lee Goldstein
 Craig Smith
 Dennise Garcia

The current clerk of the court is Lisa Matz.

References

External links
 http://www.txcourts.gov/5thcoa Official Website

State appellate courts of the United States
Texas state courts